50CAN (The 50-State Campaign for Achievement Now) is a nonprofit education advocacy group founded in January 2011 and headquartered in Washington, D.C., United States According to its website, 50CAN's mission is to advocate for a high-quality education for all kids, regardless of their address. The organization aims to find, connect and support local leaders in states across the country to help them improve educational policies in their communities.

History 
50CAN grew out of ConnCAN (founded in 2005) and was incubated inside the Connecticut nonprofit in 2010 before being formally spun off as an independent organization in 2011. Marc Porter Magee left his role as ConnCAN chief operating officer to establish 50CAN. He become 50CAN's first president, later becoming the organization's chief executive officer. 50CAN employs 34 people, and it runs education campaigns in nine states.

In 2021, 50CAN launched a new policy framework with five promises to America’s children called “Believe in Better.” In 2022, CEO Marc Porter Magee announced in a new strategic plan that the organization was dedicated to building the American education system of the future.

Affiliate offices 
50CAN currently operates policy campaigns in nine states. In 2016, it announced it would grow to additional states by merging with StudentsFirst, and that former StudentsFirst chapters would retain their branding within their states.

Trainings 
50CAN offers several programs to engage local leaders in the education advocacy movement, including the Education Advocacy Fellowship, YouCAN and National Voices Fellowship. The organization provides trainings to other education and advocacy groups, including Advocacy 101 and Political Advocacy 101.

In the fall of 2015, 50CAN published The 50CAN Guide to Building Advocacy Campaigns: 2nd Edition on iBooks and Kindle. In 2019, the organization published a companion book, The 50CAN Guide to Political Advocacy.

CEO Marc Porter Magee, in collaboration with FutureEd at Georgetown University, launched AdvocacyLabs, an initiative that gathers both data and the perspectives of social scientists to inform advocates about best practices in the field.

Campaigns 
To date, 50CAN has run 74 advocacy campaigns across 15 states and claims 166 "policy victories for public school children and their families".

50CAN counts among its policy achievements a large-scale expansion of preschool in Minnesota, a $282 million increase in teacher salaries in North Carolina, the opening of Achievement First public charter schools in Rhode Island, overhauling the teacher tenure system in New York, offering computer science and programming courses to all K-12 students in Hawaii and expanding direct educational aid builds in a number of states, including Tennessee and Georgia.

References

External links 
"50CAN" Giving Library. 2012.
"State Ed Advocacy Group, 50CAN, Looks to Expand" Education Week. October 7, 2011.
"By the Company It Keeps: Marc Porter Magee." Flypaper. June 26, 2013.
"HotSeat Interview: 50CAN Creator Marc Porter Magee." Education Week. March 17, 2011.
"New advocacy group with city roots enters state’s reform fray." GothamSchools. January 11, 2012.
"Study looks ‘under the hood’ of new teacher-evaluation systems." The Hechinger Report. May 31, 2012.
Guidestar.com

Educational organizations based in the United States
Non-profit organizations based in Washington, D.C.
2011 establishments in Washington, D.C.
Advocacy groups in the United States